Naviar (also Romanized as Nāvīār; also known as Nāvīā, Nāvayān, and Nāvīyā) is a village in Shoqan Rural District, Jolgeh Shoqan District, Jajrom County, North Khorasan Province, Iran. At the 2006 census, its population was 180, in 54 families.

References 

Populated places in Jajrom County